Craspedosis melanura is a moth of the family Geometridae. It is found in New Guinea.

References

Moths of New Guinea
Boarmiini
Moths described in 1877